Vadimas Petrenko (born 26 March 1974) is a Lithuanian former professional footballer. He played the position of midfielder and is a former member of the Lithuania national football team.

External links

1974 births
Living people
Lithuanian footballers
Lithuania international footballers
FK Atlantas players
FBK Kaunas footballers
FK Žalgiris players
FK Liepājas Metalurgs players
Czech First League players
SK Sigma Olomouc players
FCI Levadia Tallinn players
FK Panerys Vilnius players
Lithuanian expatriate footballers
Expatriate footballers in Latvia
Expatriate footballers in Estonia
FC Lokomotiv Nizhny Novgorod players
Russian Premier League players
Expatriate footballers in Russia
Lithuanian expatriate sportspeople in Latvia
Association football midfielders
Meistriliiga players
Lithuanian expatriate sportspeople in Estonia
Lithuanian expatriate sportspeople in Russia